The Ferrocarril Caleta Coloso a Aguas Blancas (Aguas Blancas Railway) was a  narrow gauge railway operating in the Antofagasta region of Chile, and was built to serve the nitrate workings southeast of Antofagasta. Opened in 1902 it was taken over by the Ferrocarril de Antofagasta a Bolivia in 1909. Never converted to  like its parent, it retained  gauge track until it closed in 1961.

References 

Railway lines in Chile
Antofagasta Province
Saltpeter works in Chile
2 ft 6 in gauge railways in Chile
Companies based in Antofagasta Region